The Wijde Bay Formation is a geologic formation exposed on the island of Spitzbergen, Svalbard, Norway. It preserves fossils dating back to the Givetian stage of the Devonian period. It was originally known as the "Wijdefjorden Series" or the "Wijde Bay Series".

See also

 List of fossiliferous stratigraphic units in Norway

References

 

Geologic formations of Norway
Devonian System of Europe
Devonian Norway